Vinland was the name given to an area of North America by the Norsemen, about the year 1000 CE.

Vinland may also refer to:

Places in the United States
 Vinland, Kansas
 Vinland, Wisconsin
 Vinland Estate, an estate owned by Salve Regina University in Newport, Rhode Island

Literature
 Vinland sagas, two Icelandic sagas written around 1200 CE
 Vinland (novel), a historical novel by George Mackay Brown
 Vinland the Good, a film script by Nevil Shute and a juvenile historical novel by Henry Treece
 Vinland Saga (manga), a Japanese historical manga by Makoto Yukimura

See also

 Vinland Saga (disambiguation)
 Vinlanders, a Canadian folk-metal band
  
 Vin (disambiguation)
 Land (disambiguation)